Hublot is a Swiss luxury watchmaker founded in 1980 by Italian Carlo Crocco. The company operates as a wholly owned subsidiary of the French luxury conglomerate LVMH.

History 

A scion of the Italian Binda Group dynasty, best known for making Breil watches, Carlo Crocco left the company in 1976, to start a watch company. Moving to Switzerland he formed MDM Geneve and set about designing a watch that he named the Hublot after the French word for "porthole". The watch that he created featured the first natural rubber strap in the history of watchmaking. It took three years of research to create the strap. Despite failing to attract a single potential customer on the first day of its debut at the 1980, Basel Watch Fair, the watch quickly proved to be a commercial success with sales in excess of $US2 million in its first year.

The Jean-Claude Biver era 
Crocco, preoccupied by his own design work and many activities for the Hand-in-Hand Foundation, a charity helping deprived children all around the world, set out to look for someone to who oversee Hublot. In late 2003, Jean-Claude Biver, then president of Swatch Group's Omega division, met Crocco, and in May 2004, Biver assumed duties as CEO, becoming a board member and minority shareholder in Hublot Watches.

Upon his arrival, Biver set about creating a new flagship collection that was unveiled in Basel in April 2005, with the Hublot "Big Bang" chronograph. It was an immediate success and orders increased threefold in one year. A few months later, in November 2005, the Big Bang chronograph was awarded internationally, receiving the "2005 Design Prize" in the "Geneva Watchmaking Grand Prix", the "Sports Watch Prize" at the "Watch of the Year" ceremony in Japan, and the Middle Eastern Prize for the "Best Oversized Watch" at the Editor’s Choice "Watch of the Year" in Bahrain. Following the arrival of Biver in 2004, the brand's sales were 24 million Swiss francs and by the end of 2006, sales were close to 100 million Swiss franc.

Hublot stores 

, Hublot had 169 Boutiques in several countries. In February 2007, Hublot opened its first mono-brand store in Paris, in the Rue Saint-Honoré. The second was opened in the summer of that year, in the Hôtel Byblos, Saint-Tropez. Today, Hublot has store on Bond Street, London. United States locations include Bal Harbour, Beverly Hills, Boca Raton, Dallas, Houston, two in Las Vegas, New York, Palm Beach and Scottsdale.

Acquisition by LVMH 
In April 2008, luxury goods group LVMH announced it had acquired Hublot from Crocco for an undisclosed fee, adding to its existing portfolio of watch brands including TAG Heuer.

Hublot WISeKey 
At BaselWorld 2009, Hublot unveiled a new method of detecting counterfeit watches. Using a smart card, the system authenticates watches on Hublot's servers. The system went live in August 2009.

Notable models 

 The Hublot Big Bang Sang Bleu II, available in titanium or king gold.
 The Hublot Big Bang Meca-10, available in titanium, magic gold, or king gold.
 The Hublot Big Bang Unico GMT, available in titanium or carbon fiber.

Sponsorships 

To increase the public profile of their brand Hublot have engaged in a number of sponsorship deals. In 2008, they agreed a sponsorship deal with the football club Manchester United, worth £4 million a year. Later, Hublot started endorsing some top football clubs like FC Bayern Munich, Juventus, Paris Saint-Germain, Ajax Amsterdam.

In 2019, Hublot became the first watch brand to work with ICC when the brand was announced as official time keeper for cricket's flagship event, 2019 ICC cricket world cup co-hosted by England and Wales.

In 2015, the company signed an agreement with San Lorenzo de Almagro of Argentina.

They provided special versions of their Big Bang watches to referees officiating at UEFA Euro 2008. In March 2010, Hublot was appointed the Official Watchmaker of Formula 1. Hublot have released a number of Formula One themed watches, including celebrating the return of the US Grand Prix to Austin, Texas, US in November 2012, with the Hublot F1 King Power Austin .

In April 2010, Hublot became the official time keeper of the 2010 FIFA World Cup and the 2014 FIFA World Cup. They have also been involved in a tie-up with the Financial Times, sponsoring the newspaper's iPad app.

Hublot and Ferrari announced during the 2011, Ferrari World Finals at Mugello a long-term strategic partnership which will officially start on 1 January 2012, making Hublot Ferrari's "Official Watch" and "Official Timekeeper". The partnership has so far been built on two watches: the Hublot Big Bang Ferrari Magic Gold and Big Bang Ferrari Titanium.

The company also the sponsors of the National Basketball Association's Los Angeles Lakers and Miami Heat.

They were also the sponsors of the FIS Nordic World Ski Championships 2011 in Oslo.

Hublot continued its sponsorship and partnership activities in 2012 with becoming the Official Watch of the UEFA EURO 2012 tournament and Official Timekeeper of the tournament.

In April 2012, Hublot Partnered the Swiss Confederation at the World Expo 2012 in South Korea, a 3-month world event, where countries have the opportunity to promote themselves to the world. and displayed its new Divers Watch the Hublot Oceanographic 4000 King Gold White, which has been tested to a water resistance of 5,000 m and is certified water resistant to 4,000 m.

Hublot also partnered with the Archaeological Museum of Athens in presenting Hublot's "Tribute to the Antikythera Mechanism" movement. The Hublot movement officially joined the National Museum's collection on 5 April 2012, and will now be on display alongside the remains of the original mechanism.

In January 2013, Scuderia Ferrari had Hublot as its official sponsor for 2013, 2014 and 2015 F1 Season.

In November 2015, Hublot was the official timekeeper and a major sponsor of the inaugural WBSC Premier12 international baseball tournament held in Taiwan and Japan, promoting their partnership with the motto, "Hublot Loves Baseball."

In February 2019, the company signed an agreement with Club Olimpia from Paraguay.

In September 2020, Hublot was announced as the new official timekeeper of the Premier League, starting from the 2020–21 season.

From 2021, Hublot is no longer listed as a sponsor for Scuderia Ferrari, being replaced by Richard Mille.

Ambassador
At the opening ceremony for its first store in Beijing, Biver introduced Jet Li as Hublot's next brand ambassador. Li is the brand's first Asian ambassador as well as the first film star to work as a Hublot ambassador. Other brand ambassadors have included Formula 1 driver Ayrton Senna's family and Institute; world's fastest man Usain Bolt; designer Samuel Ross; France and PSG player Kylian Mbappé; football player Pelé; American boxer Floyd Mayweather, Indian cricketer Rohit Sharma and formerly, the Manchester United football team, golfers Dustin Johnson, Justin Rose and Patrick Reed. 

Hublot has also developed a network of Friend of the Brand in the fields football, gastronomy, arts and sports. These include 2018 Ballon d'Or winner Ada Hegerberg, football coaches José Mourinho, Gareth Southgate, and Didier Deschamps, tennis players Simona Halep and Elina Svitolina, chefs Yannick Alléno and Paul Pairet. Former footballer Diego Maradona was a Hublot Friend of the Brand until his death in 2020.

Formula One Management President and CEO, Bernie Ecclestone, was attacked by four men and had his Hublot watch stolen. He later worked with Hublot to use his bruised face in an ad campaign with the tag line, "See what people will do for a Hublot."

In August 2021, Serbian professional tennis player Novak Djokovic became a Hublot brand ambassador.

References

External links

 Hublot's official website

LVMH brands
Companies based in the canton of Vaud
Swiss companies established in 1980
Manufacturing companies established in 1980
Swiss watch brands
Watch manufacturing companies of Switzerland